Burlington Hotel may refer to:

in England
 The original Burlington Hotel, London, where Florence Nightingale stayed for many decades, which was purchased by owner of Morley's Hotel
 Burlington Hotel, Sheringham in Sheringham, Norfolk.
Claremont Hotel (Eastbourne) (includes the former Burlington hotel)

in Ireland
 Burlington Hotel (Dublin)

in the United States (by state)
Burlington Hotel (Denver, Colorado), listed on the NRHP in Colorado
Burlington Hotel (Alma, Wisconsin), listed on the NRHP in Wisconsin